Leigh Bowery (26 March 1961 – 31 December 1994) was an Australian performance artist, club promoter, and fashion designer. Bowery was known for his flamboyant and outlandish costumes and makeup as well as his (sometimes controversial) performances.

Based in London for much of his adult life, he was a significant model and muse for the English painter Lucian Freud. Bowery's friend and fellow performer Boy George said he saw Bowery's outrageous performances a number of times, and that it "never ceased to impress or revolt".

Early life and early years in London 
Bowery was born and raised in Sunshine, a suburb of Melbourne, Australia. From an early age, he studied music, played piano, and went on to study fashion and design at RMIT for a year. He moved to London in 1980: 'I was so itchy to see new things and to see the world, that I just left', he said in 1987. There he became part of the New Romantic club scene. He worked in a clothing shop and appeared in commercials for Pepe jeans.

He soon became an influential and lively figure in the underground clubs of London and New York, as well as in art and fashion circles. He attracted attention by wearing wildly outlandish and creative outfits that he made himself. He became friends and roommates with Guy Barnes (known as "Trojan") and David Walls. Bowery created costumes for them to wear, and the trio became known in the clubs as the Three Kings.

In 2005 The National Portrait Gallery of Australia acquired a portrait of Bowery in his infamous fur coat by photographer David Gwinnutt. In 2007 The National Portrait Gallery, London purchased the David Gwinnutt portrait of Leigh Bowery and Trojan (Guy Barnes) which also appears in the Violette Editions book.

Taboo 
He was known as a club promoter, and created the club called Taboo, which began as an underground party, and then opened as a club in 1985. Taboo soon became "the place to be" with long queues for those waiting to get in. Drugs, particularly ecstasy, became a part of the dancing scene for the attendees. The club was known for defying sexual convention, for embracing "polysexualism", for creating a wild atmosphere and for playing unexpected song selections.

Fashion and costume design 
As a fashion designer, Bowery had several shows exhibiting his collections in London, New York and Tokyo. He has influenced several designers and artists, and was known for wildly creative costumes, makeup, wigs and headgear, all of which combined to be striking and often kitschy.

He also designed costumes for the Michael Clark Dance Company. When that company performed at the Brooklyn Academy of Music in 1987, Bowery won a Bessie Award for his work on No Fire Escape in Hell.

Performance artist 
As a performance artist he enjoyed creating the costumes, and often shocking audiences. He first appeared at the Anthony D'Offay Gallery in London in 1988. In a signature performance, he would appear on stage in outlandish drag or other costume, looking huge. He would sing and dance about. Then suddenly, much to the audience's surprise, he would drop onto his back and simulate giving birth to a petite and naked young woman, who was his friend, assistant and later wife Nicola Bateman.

She had been hidden for the first part of the performance by being strapped to Leigh's belly with her face in his crotch. Then she would slip out of her harness and appear to pop out of Bowery's belly along with a lot of stage blood and links of sausages, while Bowery wailed. Bowery would then bite off the umbilical cord and the two would take a bow. Boy George said he saw it a number of times, and that it "never ceased to impress or revolt".

Lucian Freud's model 
In London in 1988, Bowery met the noted painter Lucian Freud in his club Taboo. They were introduced by a friend they had in common, the artist Cerith Wyn Evans. Freud had seen Bowery perform at Anthony d'Offay Gallery, in London. In Bowery's first public appearance in the context of fine art, Bowery posed behind a one-way mirror in the gallery dressed in the flamboyant costumes he was known for.

Bowery used his body and manipulation of his flesh to create personas. This involved almost masochistically taping his torso and piercing his cheeks with pins in order to hold masks, as well as wearing outlandish makeup.  Freud said, "the way he edits his body is amazingly aware and amazingly abandoned". In return, Bowery said of Freud: "I love the psychological aspect of his work – in fact, I sometimes felt as if I had been undergoing psychoanalysis with him ... His work is full of tension. Like me, he is interested in the underbelly of things". 

Bowery posed for a number of large full-length paintings that are considered among Freud's best work. The paintings tend to exaggerate Bowery's 6-foot 3inch, and 17 stone physique to monumental proportions. The paintings had a strong impact as part of Freud's exhibition at the Metropolitan Museum of Art in 1994. Freud said he found him "perfectly beautiful", and commented, "His wonderfully buoyant bulk was an instrument I felt I could use, especially those extraordinary dancer's legs". Freud noted that Leigh by nature was a shy and gentle man, and his flamboyant persona was in part a form of self-defence.

Jonathan Jones, writing for The Guardian describes Freud's portrait, Leigh Bowery (seated):

Minty 

In 1993, Bowery formed the Romo/ art-pop band Minty with friend knitwear designer Richard Torry, Nicola Bateman, and Matthew Glammore.

In November 1994, Minty began a two-week-long show at London's Freedom Cafe, including audience member Alexander McQueen, but it was too much for Westminster City Council, who closed down the show after only one night. This was to be Bowery's last performance. The show was documented by photographer A.M. Hanson with imagery subsequently published in books about Bowery and McQueen. 

Minty was a financial loss and represented a low point in Bowery's colourful career. After his death, the band continued under the leadership of Bateman and Glammore up until the release of album Open Wide. This 1997 album was released on Candy Records and featured the singles "Useless Man", "Plastic Bag", "Nothing" and "That's Nice". A spin-off band called The Offset later formed including artist Donald Urquhart.

In 2020, Open Wide was re-issued by Candy Records in association with The state51 Conspiracy, while "Useless Man" received a remix by Boy George and a new promo video directed by Torry and Glammore.

Personal life 
Although Bowery was known to be and always described himself as gay, he married his long-time female companion Nicola Bateman on 13 May 1994 in Tower Hamlets, London, in "a personal art performance". Although he had been HIV positive for six years, very few of those who knew him guessed that; he typically explained his public absence by saying he had gone to Papua New Guinea. 

His wife did not know that Bowery had the virus until he was admitted to hospital. He died seven months after his marriage, on New Year's Eve 1994 (the date has been disputed by his father, who says he actually died in the early hours of New Year's Day, 1995), from an AIDS-related illness at the Middlesex Hospital, Westminster, London, five weeks after his admission. Lucian Freud paid for Bowery's body to be repatriated to Australia.

Taboo, the musical 
Boy George was the creative force, the lyricist and performer in the musical Taboo, which was loosely based on Bowery's club. The musical was produced in 2002 on the West End in London, and then opened on Broadway. As a performer, Boy George played Bowery.

In an interview conducted by Mark Ronson for Interview Magazine Boy George said that Bowery would sometimes speak with a posh English accent, and one didn't always know if he was sincere or mocking: He seemed to be "in character" at all times. Bowery decorated his flat in a style that was similar to the way he dressed, with Star Trek-themed wallpaper, mirrors and a large piano. He was a ringleader of misbehaviour, and with his club, he created a place where there were no rules. In the clubs at the peak of his fame, he would distort his body in various ways so that he would appear deformed, or pregnant or with breasts. Bowery once said, "Flesh is my most favourite fabric".

In popular culture 
Bowery influenced other artists and designers including Meadham Kirchhoff, Alexander McQueen, Lucian Freud, Vivienne Westwood, Boy George, Antony and the Johnsons, Lady Gaga, John Galliano, Scissor Sisters, David LaChapelle, Lady Bunny, Acid Betty, Shea Couleé, and Charles Jeffrey plus numerous Nu-Rave bands and nightclubs in London and New York City.

Bowery was the main inspiration for the Tranimal drag movement, which emphasised an animalistic and post-modern take on drag.

Bowery was the subject of a contemporary dance, physical theatre and circus show in August 2018 at the Edinburgh Fringe Festival, put on by Australian choreographer Andy Howitt.

Publications 
 Leigh Bowery Verwandlungskünstler, editor Angela Stief, published by Piet Meyer Verlag, Vienna, (2015); 
 Leigh Bowery Looks, by Leigh Bowery, Fergus Greer, published by Thames & Hudson Ltd; New Ed edition (2005); 
 Leigh Bowery Looks by Leigh Bowery, Fergus Greer, published by Violette Editions (2006); 
 Leigh Bowery, Violette Editions, London, (1998),

Discography

Minty

Album 
 Open Wide (Candy Records, CAN 2LP/CAN 2CD, LP/CD, 1997)

Singles 

All singles also included multiple remixes of the lead tracks.

The Offset

Compilation album 
The Offset Presents Minty – It's A Game - Part I (Poppy Records, POPPYCD6, 1997)

Partial videography 
 Hail the New Puritan (1985–6), Charles Atlas
 Generations of Love (1990), Baillie Walsh for Boy George
 Unfinished Sympathy (1991), Art Director for Massive Attack single
 Teach (1992), Charles Atlas
 A Smashing Night Out (1994), Matthew Glamorre
 Death in Vegas (1994), Mark Hasler
 Performance at Fort Asperen (1994)
 Flour (single screen version) (1995), Angus Cook
 U2: Popmart - Live from Mexico City (1997), Dancer during 'Lemon Mix'
 Read Only Memory (estratto) (1998), John Maybury
 “Wigstock: The documentary” (1995), Lady Bunny

See also 
 Club Kids

References

Further reading 
 Posthumous New York exhibition prospectus
 
 (IMDB) The Legend of Leigh Bowery, directed by Charles Atlas. 2002, USA/France, 88 mins duration
 
 Leigh Bowery by Robert Violette, published by Violette Editions (London, July 1998).

Audio
 An extended extract (72 minutes) of a 1989 audio interview

Video
 BBC Clothes Show excerpt with Leigh Bowery
 Donut Party hosted by Michael Alig at Twin Donuts with many New York Club regulars including Isaac Mizrahi
  Bowery footage by UK fashion photographer Nick Knight on SHOWstudio.com
 “The Legend of Leigh Bowery – Full Movie”

External links 
 
 
 
 
 
 
 
 

1961 births
1994 deaths
AIDS-related deaths in England
Australian emigrants to England
Australian fashion designers
Australian male models
Australian performance artists
Body art
Gay models
Australian LGBT entertainers
LGBT fashion designers
People educated at Melbourne High School
20th-century Australian male actors
Models from Melbourne
Australian contemporary artists
Australian gay artists
Muses
Romo
20th-century Australian male artists
20th-century Australian LGBT people
People from Sunshine, Victoria